Wildwood Kitchen is a British casual dining chain, serving Italian food, with 12 restaurants in the UK.

The chief executive of the chain is Samuel Kaye, whose family has founded other restaurant chains including ASK, Prezzo and Zizzi. It is operated by the Tasty Group.

The chain serves Italian-inspired food as well as burgers.

References

External links
 

Italian restaurants in the United Kingdom
Restaurant groups in the United Kingdom